Alfred Hirschmeier (19 March 1931 – 27 March 1996) was a German production designer. In 1995, he was a member of the jury at the 45th Berlin International Film Festival.

Selected filmography
 Five Cartridges (1960)
 Naked Among Wolves (1963)
 The Turning Point (1983)
 Spring Symphony (1983)

References

External links

1931 births
1996 deaths
German production designers
Film people from Berlin